The 2018 Cambridge City Council election took place on 3 May 2018 to elect members of Cambridge City Council in England. This was on the same day as other nationwide local elections.

Results summary

Ward results

Abbey

Arbury

Castle

Cherry Hinton

Coleridge

East Chesterton

Two seats were up due to the resignation of Margery Abbott (Labour, elected 2016)

King's Hedges

Market

Newnham

Petersfield

Queen Edith's

Romsey

Trumpington

West Chesterton

References

2018 English local elections
2018
2010s in Cambridge